Doss Glacier is a small glacier just east of Mount Boman, flowing into Nimrod Glacier from the northern slopes of the Queen Elizabeth Range. It was mapped by the United States Geological Survey from tellurometer surveys and Navy air photos, 1960–62, and named by the Advisory Committee on Antarctic Names for Edgar L. Doss, a United States Antarctic Research Program glaciologist at Roosevelt Island, 1962–63.

References 

Glaciers of the Ross Dependency
Shackleton Coast